Poloma is a genus of moths in the family Eupterotidae.

Species
 Poloma angulata Walker, 1855
 Poloma castanea Aurivillius, 1901
 Poloma nigromaculata Aurivillius, 1893

Former species
 Poloma incompta Walker, 1865

References

Eupterotinae
Moth genera